Rick Verbeek (born 14 December 1988 in Venlo) is a Dutch footballer who plays as an attacking midfielder for IVO Velden.

Career
Verbeek was added to the first team of VVV-Venlo before the 2007–08 season. He made his professional debut on 8 August 2008, coming on as a substitute, in a 5–0 win over Go Ahead Eagles. He was loaned to Helmond Sport in January 2010, staying there for the remainder of the season.

Verbeek is the son of the former VVV player, Frank Verbeek.

References

1988 births
Living people
Footballers from Venlo
Dutch footballers
Association football midfielders
VVV-Venlo players
Helmond Sport players
Eerste Divisie players
Eredivisie players
De Treffers players
RKVV EVV players